RPH Australia is the national peak representative organisation for a unique Australian network of  radio reading services designed to meet the daily information needs of people who, for any reason, are unable to access printed material. It is estimated that 22% of the Australian population has a print disability (over 5 million).

History
Historically, RPH stood for "Radio for the Print Handicapped", and these services began in Australia in 1975 on Melbourne's 3ZZ.

On 23 July 1978, the Minister for Post and Telecommunications announced, "The establishment of a special radio communications service for the blind and other people with reading difficulties." 

The federal government began its direct funding of the service with a $250,000 grant in the 1981–82 budget.

Initially using marine band (today's extended AM broadcast band) frequencies, stations in Hobart, Melbourne, and Sydney began operating. 7RPH Hobart went to air in June 1982.  3RPH Melbourne was officially opened in December the same year.

By 1984–85, RPH services were also operating in Brisbane and Canberra. After another review, the specialised stations of the service transferred to normal broadcast band frequencies in 1990 and 1991. 

Material from the network is heard on a small number of non-network community stations in Australia and on the Radio Reading Service of New Zealand.

In December 2013, all RPH Australia network stations joined the new VAST satellite platform.

RPH Australia Radio Reading Network Stations

Radio 1RPH
Canberra: 1125 kHz AM and DAB+
Wagga Wagga: 89.5 MHz FM
Junee: 99.5 FM (retransmission by Junee Shire Council)
Internet stream: 
Australia: Viewer Access Satellite Television, radio channel 632

2RPH
Sydney: 1224 kHz AM and DAB+
Sydney Eastern Suburbs: 100.5 MHz FM and DAB+
Newcastle: 100.5 MHz FM
Wollongong: 93.3 MHz FM
Australia: Viewer Access Satellite Television, radio channel 632

4RPH
Brisbane: 1296 kHz AM and DAB+
Australia: Viewer Access Satellite Television, radio channel 632

Vision Australia Radio (3RPH)
Albury: 2APH 101.7 MHz FM
Bendigo: 3BPH 88.7 MHz FM
Darwin, Northern Territory: 3RPH DAB+
Geelong: 3GPH 99.5 kHz FM
Melbourne: 3RPH 1179 kHz AM and DAB+
Mildura: 3MPH 107.5 MHz FM
Shepparton: 3SPH 100.1 MHz FM
Warragul: 3RPH 93.5 MHz FM
Warrnambool: 3RPH 882 kHz AM
Australia & New Zealand: Optus Aurora, radio channel 12 (Melbourne feed)?? VAST
Australia: Viewer Access Satellite Television, radio channel 632

5RPH
Adelaide: 1197 kHz AM and DAB+
Australia: Viewer Access Satellite Television, radio channel 632

990 Vision Australia Radio, Perth (6RPH)
Perth: 990 kHz AM and DAB+
Australia: Viewer Access Satellite Television, radio channel 632

Print Radio Tasmania (7RPH)
Hobart: 864 kHz AM and DAB+
Launceston: 106.9 MHz FM
Devonport: 96.1 MHz FM
Australia: Viewer Access Satellite Television, radio channel 632

NDIS
In February 2016, funding from the National Disability Insurance Scheme (NDIS) was called into question after July 2016, with 1RPH being the first station to have funding from previous Disability services sources withdrawn.

See also
Community Broadcasting Association of Australia
Community Broadcasting Foundation

External links 
 RPH Australia
 Community Broadcasting Association of Australia (CBAA)

Accessibility
Australian radio networks
Radio reading services of Australia
Radio stations established in 1982